Brisa Yamila Da Silva Esquiera (born 20 March 2002) is a Uruguayan footballer who plays as a goalkeeper for Colón FC and the Uruguay women's national team.

International career
Da Silva made her senior debut for Uruguay on 6 October 2019.

References 

2002 births
Living people
Women's association football goalkeepers
Uruguayan women's footballers
Uruguay women's international footballers
Juventud de Las Piedras players
Colón F.C. players
Lesbian sportswomen
LGBT association football players
Uruguayan LGBT sportspeople
Uruguayan lesbians
21st-century Uruguayan LGBT people